Forest is a novel written by the award-winning Australian novelist, Sonya Hartnett. It was first published in 2001 in Australia by Viking.

Dedication
"For Greg, who loves cats."

Epigraph
"'Cats, no less liquid than their shadows, Offer no angles to the wind." - A. S. Tessimond

Awards
 Won - CBCA Children's Book of the Year Award: Older Readers (2002) 
 Shortlisted - South Australian Festival Awards for Literature (2002)

Reception
Discussing Forest, Lesley Hawkes finds that "Hartnett offers new and exciting avenues of thought regarding the place of humans in that [Australian] environment.".

References

2001 novels
2001 children's books
Australian children's novels
Novels by Sonya Hartnett
CBCA Children's Book of the Year Award-winning works
Viking Press books
Children's novels about animals
Novels about cats
Australian children's books